Travis Daniel Lashley (born August 13, 1987), better known by his stage name Trav is an American rapper, singer, songwriter, record producer, and actor from Queens, New York.

Early life
Born and raised in Jamaica, Queens, Trav started rapping at the age of 21, catching the attention of NYC tastemakers, including DJ Whoo Kid and DJ Green Lantern. Trav credits his first big break to DJ Green Lantern’s radio show on Sirius XM.

Career
In 2009, Trav released his first solo mixtape, The Way I See It which received over half a million downloads. The tape featured single "Ride The Wave" which was later remixed featuring Juelz Santana and Lloyd Banks.

After releasing his 2nd Mixtape "Follow Me" Trav was selected as a Featured Artist on Myspace, which featured both singles "Follow Me" and "Ride the Wave". Trav also met follow artist Sean Kingston on Myspace, in an interview saying "Sean Kingston is really my right hand man. The crazy thing about us, we met on MySpace…. What makes it even crazier, we found out after his mother came home from jail, his mother and my uncle are related in Jamaica. And Sean's grandfather is the one who put my uncle on, gave him his start (in music). It was like a circle." 
"". Trav later joined Kingston in supporting Justin Bieber on his "My World Tour’.

On December 8, 2017, Trav released his album QRAK (pronounced as "Crack"), featuring tracks with Meek Mill, Belly, Lil Durk, Tory Lanez, Blac Youngsta & Don Q. The acronym stands for (Queens Raised A King) with Trav saying "The title QRAK stands for Queens Raised A King. I’m from Queens and it has a double metaphor to it like a young queen raised a king and then Queens is my hood, my borough in New York City." In an interview about the album Trav explained "I felt like I was missing a little bit, I felt like I had to bring a little bit of aggression back. I felt like I had to have a different approach to let people know I wasn't playing, that I had records. For my core following, the people whose aware of me they’re going to be like ‘oh damn, I remember this’. I didn't put out music in like a year or two, a year in a half. So now it's like I got to come through like nah he snapping, he's too crazy, you know what I mean? I have to!"

On May 24, 2019, Trav released the single "Called It", featuring Canadian rapper Nav. It was released with the official music video. Trav later joined Nav on his 25-date Bad Habits Tour.

On February 6, 2020, Trav released the single "Real Nigga Party", featuring American rapper Lil Durk, which serves as the lead single to his debut studio album, Nothing Happens Overnight. On March 4, 2020, the album's second single, "Mexico", was released. On March 25, 2020,  the third single, "You Choose", featuring Canadian rapper and singer Tory Lanez was released. On July 23, 2020, the fourth and final single, "Pradaaa Shoes", featuring Nav, was released. All singles were released alongside official music videos. The album was released on August 13, 2020, Trav's 30th birthday.

Discography
 The Way I See It (2009)
 Follow Me 
 Push (2012)
 Push 2 (2014)
 Push 3 (2016)
 QRAK (2017)
 Nothing Happens Overnight (2020)

References

Living people
1987 births
20th-century American businesspeople
20th-century American musicians
21st-century American rappers
African-American male rappers
Musicians from New York (state)
Rappers from New York (state)
Songwriters from New York (state)
African-American songwriters
20th-century American male musicians
21st-century American male musicians
20th-century African-American musicians
21st-century African-American musicians
American male songwriters